The 2004 MTV Europe Music Awards were held at Tor di Valle Racecourse, Rome, Italy. As in 2003, the awards ceremony was held in a 6,000-capacity big top arena constructed specifically for the main event.

Award presenters on the night included Jamelia, Alicia Keys, N.E.R.D, Naomi Campbell, Andre 3000, Kid Rock and Kanye West.

Nominations 
Winners are in bold text.

Regional nominations
Winners are in bold text.

Performances

Pre show
Carmen Consoli
Hoobastank — "The Reason"
The Cure
Elisa

Main show
Eminem — "Like Toy Soldiers / Just Lose It"
Franz Ferdinand — "Take Me Out"
Maroon 5 — "This Love"
Usher and Alicia Keys — "My Boo"
Beastie Boys — "An Open Letter to NYC"
Gwen Stefani — "What You Waiting For?"
Anastacia — "Left Outside Alone"
Nelly (featuring Pharrell) — "Flap Your Wings / Play It Off"
The Hives — "Two-Timing Touch and Broken Bones"
Tiziano Ferro — "Sere Nere"

Appearances 
Kylie Minogue — presented Best Album
Paolo Di Canio and Alessandro Del Piero — presented Best Rock
Kid Rock — introduced Franz Ferdinand
Brian Molko and Amy Lee — presented Best Alternative
Ozzy Osbourne and Sharon Osbourne — presented Best Group
Elisha Cuthbert and Kanye West — presented Best Video
Sarah Michelle Gellar — introduced Anastacia
Jamelia and N.E.R.D — presented Best R&B
Brian McFadden, Nick Carter and A. J. McLean — presented Best Pop
Robert Smith — introduced Gwen Stefani
Alicia Keys — presented Free Your Mind Award
Duran Duran — presented Best New Act
Natasha Bedingfield, Chester Bennington and Joe Hahn — presented Best Female
Naomi Campbell — presented Best Male
Sarah Michelle Gellar — presented Best Song

See also
2004 MTV Video Music Awards

References

2004 in Italy
2004 music awards
2004
2000s in Rome
2004 in Italian music
November 2004 events in Europe